A List of people from Aalborg, Denmark:

Born in Aalborg

 Elisabeth Bumiller (born 1956) journalist, the Washington bureau chief for The New York Times 
 Henning Carlsen (1927–2014) a cinéma vérité film director 
 Hanne Dahl (born 1970), a priest and former politician 
 Camilla Dallerup (born 1974) an author, hypnotherapist and ballroom dancer
 Emilie Esther (born 1999), pop singer
 Mette Frederiksen (born 1977), Prime Minister of Denmark since June 2019
 Henning G. Jensen (born 1950) Mayor in Aalborg Municipality 1998-2013
 John (1455–1513), King of Denmark, Norway and Sweden
 Preben Kaas (1930–1981), actor and comedian 
 Søren Anton van der Aa Kühle (1849-1906) a Danish brewer, CEO of Carlsberg Group
 Dan Laustsen (born 1954), a Danish cinematographer 
 Jørgen Lyng (born 1934), a retired Danish general, former Chief of Defence (Denmark) 
 Helle Michaelsen (born 1968), Playboy playmate of the month, August 1988
 Christen Winther Obel (1800-1860), tobacco producer
 Otto E. Ravn (1881–1952), Assyriologist and professor at the University of Copenhagen
 Britta Thomsen (born 1954), politician, former MEP
 Broder Knud Brodersen Wigelsen (1787-1867), naval officer
 Adrian Zandberg (born 4 December 1979), Polish politician, member of the Sejm from Lewica Razem.
 Soulshock (born 1968), stage name of musician Carsten Højer Schack

Sport 

 Torben Boye (born 1966) a former pro. footballer, 560 caps for Aalborg Boldspilklub (AaB)
 Heinz Ehlers (born 1966) a professional ice hockey coach and former player
 Nikolaj Ehlers (born 1996), ice hockey player in the National Hockey League
 Peter Gade (born 1976), badminton player, multiple championship medallist
 Kasper Hjulmand (born 1972) football manager, head coach for the Denmark 
 Jes Høgh (born 1966) a former footballer with 362 club caps and 57 for Denmark
 Benny Nielsen (born 1966), butterfly swimmer, 1988 Olympic silver medallist
 Joachim Olsen (born 1977), shot putter,  2004 Olympic silver medallist & politician
 Anne Van Olst (born 1962), dressage rider, 2008 Olympic team bronze medallist
 Christinna Pedersen (born 1986) an elite badminton player, 2012 and 2016 Olympic team silver and bronze medallist
 Mads Sogaard (born 2000) ice hockey goaltender in the American Hockey League.

Once resided in Aalborg

 Jens Bang (1575-1644) a wealthy Danish merchant, lived in Aalborg from age 22
 Bent Flyvbjerg (born 1952), researcher at Oxford University, longer engagement at Aalborg
 Frank Jensen (born 1961), politician and former Danish Minister, grew up in Aalborg
 Daniel Kandi (born 1983), trance music producer and DJ, currently living in Aalborg
 Bjørn Lomborg (born 1965), statistician and author, grew up in Aalborg
 Lone Drøscher Nielsen (born 1964), wildlife conservationist, a young volunteer in Aalborg zoo
 Jens Munk (1579–1628), navigator and explorer, moved to Aalborg aged eight  
 Poul Pagh (1796–1870), Aalborg businessman in trade and shipping
 Marie Rée (1835–1900), newspaper publisher, ran Aalborg Stiftstidende
 Lisa Holm Sørensen (born 1982) a retired professional golfer, lives in Aalborg
 Jørn Utzon (1918–2008), architect, grew up in Aalborg

References 

 
Aalborg